Starovoytov or Starovoitov (feminine:Starovoytova Starovoitova) is a Russian-language surname. Notable people with the surname include:

Aleksandr Starovoitov (1940–2021), Russian security services officer and academic
Alexander Starovoitov (born 1972), Russian politician
Alyona Starovoitova, Russian ice hockey player
Andrei Starovoytov (1915–1997), Soviet ice hockey administrator, referee, and player
Galina Starovoitova

See also
 
 
 Starovoit

East Slavic-language surnames